The following outline is provided as an overview of and topical guide to space exploration.

Space exploration – use of astronomy and space technology to explore outer space. Physical exploration of space is conducted both by human spaceflights and by robotic spacecraft.

Essence of space exploration 

Space exploration

Branches of space exploration 

 
 Uncrewed spaceflight – Autonomous space travel without human

History of space exploration 

 Remote sensing of Earth
 Exploration of the Moon
 Apollo program
 Moon landings
 Robotic exploration of the Moon
 Exploration of Mercury
 Exploration of Venus
 Exploration of Mars
 Mars landings
 Mars rovers
Mars Rotorcrafts
 Exploration of Jupiter
 Exploration of Saturn
 Exploration of Uranus
 Exploration of Neptune
 History of human spaceflight
 Project Mercury
 Project Gemini
 Apollo program
 Space Shuttle program
 Vostok program
 Voskhod program
 Soyuz program
 Shenzhou program
 List of human spaceflights
 List of Space Shuttle missions
 Spaceflight records
 Emergence of market forces in spaceflight
 Timeline of artificial satellites and space probes
 Timeline of astronauts by nationality
 Timeline of first orbital launches by country
 Timeline of rocket and missile technology
 Timeline of space exploration
 Timeline of space travel by nationality
 Timeline of spaceflight
 Timeline of the Space Race
 Timeline of Solar System exploration

Space agencies 

 List of government space agencies
 Space agencies capable of human spaceflight (as of June 2020)
 NASA (USA)
 CNSA (China)
 Space agencies with full launch capability
 NASA (USA)
 RFSA (Russia)
 CNSA (China)
 ESA (Europe)
 JAXA (Japan)
 ISRO (India)
 ISA (Israel)
 KARI (South Korea)

Active space missions 
 International Space Station
 Tiangong space station
 Chandrayaan-2 (ISRO)
 Chang'e 4 (CNSA)
 CAPSTONE (NASA)
 Danuri (KARI])
 Mars Odyssey (NASA)
 Mars Express  – ESA satellite orbiting Mars
 Mars Reconnaissance Orbiter (NASA)
 Mars Science Laboratory – NASA rover to Mars
 MAVEN  – NASA satellite orbiting Mars
 Mars Orbiter Mission (ISRO) – satellite orbiting Mars
 ExoMars (ESA / Roscosmos) – Mars mission
 InSight (NASA)
 Emirates Mars Mission
 Tianwen-1 (CNSA)
 Mars 2020 – NASA rover and helicopter to Mars
 Akatsuki – JAXA satellite orbiting Venus
 BepiColombo (ESA / JAXA)
 Parker Solar Probe – NASA probe to Sun
 Hayabusa2 (JAXA) – sample return mission to asteroid Ryugu
 OSIRIS-REx (NASA) – sample return mission to asteroid Bennu
 Lucy – NASA probe to multiple Jupiter trojans
 DART – NASA probe to impact asteroid Didymos's moon
 Juno – NASA satellite orbiting Jupiter
 New Horizons – probe to Pluto
 Voyager (NASA) – probe to outer Solar System and interstellar space

Future of space exploration 

Lunar (the Moon)
 Future lunar missions
 Colonization of the Moon
 Lunar outpost (NASA)
Sun
 Sundiver (space mission)
Mercury
 Colonization of Mercury
Venus
 Exploration of Venus
Mars
 Colonization of Mars
 Human mission to Mars
 Mars to Stay
Outer Solar System
 Colonization of the outer Solar System
 Colonization of Titan
Beyond the Solar System
 Interstellar travel
 Nuclear rocket
 Fusion rocket
 Solar sail
 Einstein-Rosen bridge
 Alcubierre drive
 Intergalactic travel

General space exploration concepts

Space exploration scholars

Leaders in space exploration 
Yuri Gagarin – first man in space
Neil Armstrong and Buzz Aldrin – first men to walk on the Moon
John Glenn – oldest man in orbit

See also 

 Outline of space science
 Outline of aerospace
 Timeline of Solar System exploration
 Scientific research on the International Space Station

 Lists
 Assembly of the International Space Station
 Space Shuttle crews
 List of Apollo astronauts
 List of Apollo missions
 List of Artemis missions
 List of artificial objects on extra-terrestrial surfaces
 List of astronauts by name
 List of astronauts by selection
 List of communication satellite companies
 List of communications satellite firsts
 List of Constellation missions
 List of Cosmos satellites
 List of crewed spacecraft
 List of cumulative spacewalk records
 List of Earth observation satellites
 List of human spaceflight programs
 List of human spaceflights
 List of human spaceflights to the International Space Station
 List of interplanetary voyages
 List of ISS spacewalks
 List of International Space Station expeditions
 List of International Space Station visitors
 List of landings on extraterrestrial bodies
 List of launch vehicles
 List of Mir expeditions
 List of Mir spacewalks
 List of NASA missions
 List of objects at Lagrangian points
 List of private spaceflight companies
 List of probes by operational status
 List of rockets
 Lists of rocket launches
 List of Ariane launches
 List of Atlas launches
 List of Black Brant launches
 List of Falcon 9 and Falcon Heavy launches
 List of Long March launches
 List of Proton launches
 List of R-7 launches
 List of Scout launches
 List of Space Launch System launches
 List of Thor and Delta launches
 List of Titan launches
 List of V-2 test launches
 List of Zenit launches
 List of Russian human spaceflight missions
 List of satellites in geosynchronous orbit
 List of satellites which have provided data on Earth's magnetosphere
 List of Solar System probes
 List of Soviet human spaceflight missions
 List of space agencies
 List of Space Shuttle missions
 List of space travelers by name
 List of space travelers by nationality
 List of spacecraft and crews that visited Mir
 List of spacecraft manufacturers
 List of spaceflight records
 List of spaceports
 List of spacewalks and moonwalks
 List of the largest fixed satellite operators
 List of uncrewed spacecraft by program
 Uncrewed spaceflights to the International Space Station

References

External links

 Space related news
 NASA's website on human space travel
 ESA: Building the ISS
 Unofficial Shuttle Launch Manifest
 ISS Assembly Animation

Space exploration
Space exploration
Space exploration
Space 
exploration
Outline
Space exploration